Four British Royal Navy ships have been called HMS Ulysses:

 , 44-gun fifth rate launched in 1779 and sold in 1816. Because Ulysses served in the navy's Egyptian campaign (8 March to 2 September 1801), her officers and crew qualified for the clasp "Egypt" to the Naval General Service Medal, which the Admiralty issued in 1847 to all surviving claimants.
 HMS Ulysses (1913) was briefly the name of a destroyer, launched on 18 August 1913, and renamed Lysander  on 30 September 1913.
 , a modified R-class destroyer launched in 1917 and sunk in a collision in 1919
 , a World War II U-class destroyer launched in 1943, reclassified as a frigate in 1953, and sold for scrap in 1979.

In fiction
HMS Ulysses was also the name of a fictional light cruiser in a novel of the same title by Alistair MacLean.

See also
 , for motor vessels named Ulysses
 , for steamships named Ulysses
 ,for United States Navy vessels
 Ulysses (disambiguation)

References

Sources
 
 

Royal Navy ship names